Li Gu (李固; 94- December 147 or January 148), style name Zijian (子堅), was an Eastern Han Dynasty scholar and official. Twice, he opposed Liang Ji, a powerful consort kin, on the issue of succession of the imperial throne.

Service under Emperor Chong
On 27 September 144, after Emperor Chong ascended the throne, Li Gu was appointed Grand Commandant. However, Emperor Chong died the next year at the age of two. After Emperor Chong's death, Li Gu advocated that Liu Suan, Prince of Qinghe, should ascend the throne, citing his age and virtue. However, Liang Ji ignored him and made Liu Zuan (the future Emperor Zhi, then the son of Prince of Le'an Liu Hong) emperor instead.

Service under Emperor Zhi
When Emperor Zhi ascended the throne in 145, Li Gu retained his post as Grand Commandant. However, Liang Ji soon became apprehensive of Emperor Zhi's intelligence. On 26 July 146, he had his underlings poison a bowl of pastry soup and had it given to the emperor. After the young emperor consumed the soup, he quickly suffered great pain, and he summoned Li immediately and also requested for water, believing that water would save him. However, Liang, who was by the emperor's side, immediately ordered that the emperor not be given any water; the young emperor immediately died. Li cried bitterly upon Emperor Zhi's death and advocated a full investigation, but Liang was able to have the investigation efforts suppressed. Soon after Emperor Zhi's death, on 29 July 146, Li Gu was dismissed as Grand Commandant.

References

90s births
147 deaths